The Divide Peaks are a series of ice-topped peaks, the highest at , rising from the southeast end of Coronation Island and extending for  in a northwesterly direction, in the South Orkney Islands. They were surveyed in 1948–49 by the Falkland Islands Dependencies Survey, 1956–58, and named in association with The Divide.

See also
Schist Point

References 

Mountains of the South Orkney Islands